Göteborgs Handels- och Sjöfartstidning (GHT) was a daily newspaper published in Gothenburg, Sweden, from 1832 to 1985.

History and profile
GHT was founded in 1832 by publisher Magnus Prytz and had a liberal alignment from the later part of the 19th century after Sven Adolf Hedlund became editor in 1852. The author Viktor Rydberg worked for the newspaper and several of his novels were published as series in the paper.

During World War II, GHT was one of few Swedish newspapers that held a decidedly anti-Nazi profile, which made its editor-in-chief (since 1917) Torgny Segerstedt a controversial figure in neutral Sweden. The Norwegian illustrator Ragnvald Blix became known for his anti-Nazi caricatures published in the paper during that time under the pseudonym "Stig Höök". The paper ceased publication in 1985 (but was only published weekly 1973-1984).

References

1832 establishments in Sweden
1973 disestablishments in Sweden
Anti-fascism in Sweden
Defunct newspapers published in Sweden
19th century in Gothenburg
Mass media in Gothenburg
Daily newspapers published in Sweden
Publications established in 1832
Publications disestablished in 1973
Swedish-language newspapers
20th century in Gothenburg